James King (1800 – 29 November 1857) was a Scottish-Australian who was important in the establishment of the wine industry in Australia.

Biography
King left Scotland in 1826 as a free settler possessed of capital, and arrived in Sydney early in 1827, and went into business as a merchant. In 1828 King received a grant of 2000 acres (8 km²) of land at Irrawang in the northern part of the colony, which became his chief interest. In 1831 he discovered some sand near Sydney suitable for glass-making, samples of which were sent to England and found to be of fine quality. This was refused, but the English authorities suggested that he should be allowed the sum of £100 off the price of any land he might purchase from the state. King was much dissatisfied, and six years later was still endeavouring to have his claim better recognized. King had no success though he was able to mention that the Society of Arts in London had awarded him its silver medal, and that he had a fresh claim on account of his having established a pottery in the colony.

Winemaking and later life
While in Australia, King had done much experimenting in vine growing and in making wine, and he continued to do this for many years, producing several varieties of wine of high quality. In 1850 he was awarded gold medals by the Horticultural Society of Sydney for a light sparkling wine and for a white wine, and at the Paris exhibition of 1855 his wines were highly commended and awarded a medal.

King left Australia in 1855 on a two years' visit to Europe and in 1857 published privately a pamphlet "Australia May Be an Extensive Wine-growing Country". King was by then in bad health, and died in London on 29 November 1857. He left a widow Eliza Elflida née Millner (1812–1887) who afterwards married William Roberts of Penrith, who by his will left £4000 to the University of Sydney for the foundation of scholarships in memory of King.

References

1800 births
1857 deaths
Settlers of Australia
Australian viticulturists
Australian winemakers